Ice Queen, originally titled Avalanche Run, is a 2005 American horror film co-written and directed by Neil Kinsella and starring Ami Chorlton. The principal photography was conducted in Vermont and the film was released directly to video on June 7, 2005 in the United States by the MTI Home Video media distributing company.

Plot
Deep in the Amazon Rainforest, a well-preserved woman dating from the ice age is found encased in amber. Her body is then loaded onto an airplane to be taken to a military facility where she can be studied by scientists. Dr. Thomas Goddard takes care of the woman on the plane, although fails to notice when her heating system malfunctions, causing it to create freezing temperatures in her tube, and it awakens her into an angry ice-monster. Meanwhile, at a nearby mountain ski resort, mountain worker Johnny has a one-night stand with Elaine, who's applying for a job at the resort the next day. Few people are left at the resort as its closed for the week, including Johnny, Elaine, Johnny's crush Tori, and her uncle Ed, who owns the resort, Johnny's friends Devlin, and Jessie, and fellow worker Audrey.

As the plane flies over the mountain, the pilot, Mac, holds Goddard at gunpoint, intending to sell the specimen for ransom. However, the Ice Queen awakens, and kills Mac before causing the plane to crash into the mountain, creating an avalanche in the process, trapping Johnny, Tori, Elaine, Audrey, Devlin, and Jessie inside the hotel, and Ed in the parking lot. The plane slides into the hotel as well during the avalanche, trapping Goddard, and the Ice Queen inside. The Ice Queen first kills Devlin alone in the hallway before attacking Jessie in a bathroom, where he manages to temporarily subdue her. Goddard soon encounters the group, revealing that if they heat her up enough, she'll die. Johnny later encounters the Ice Queen, who is shown to have a sexual attraction towards him.

Elaine is later attacked in the kitchen by the Ice Queen, and the others fight her, although she runs away. Audrey, and Goddard later find her in the dining room. Audrey attempts to fight her, but is killed while Goddard encourages his specimen to kill. The Ice Queen then attacks, and wounds Goddard, and chases Johnny, Tori, and Elaine through the hotel. The three attempt to reach the attic to escape to the surface, although Elaine is killed by the Ice Queen while Johnny, and Tori make it outside, and reunite with Ed. However, the Ice Queen follows them, and Johnny lures her into a nearby hot tub before scalding her to death. Johnny, Tori, and Ed then walk away from the scene, although, unbeknownst to them, an alive Goddard has made it to the surface, and takes a sample of the Ice Queen's remains, intending to clone her later on.

Partial cast
 Ami Chorlton as Ice Queen
 Harmon Walsh as Johnny
 Noelle Reno as Tori
 Jennifer Hill as Elaine
 Daniel Hall Kuhn as Dr. Thomas Goddard
 Tara Walden as Audrey
 Peter Wyndorf as Devlin
 Demone Gore as Jessie
 John Romeo as Ed Banks
 Neil Benedict as Mac Johansen
 Duncan Murdoch as Fresh-Face
Lucy The Dog as Patch

Reception
Film Monthly praised the film's opening three minutes, and then spoke toward the film's subsequent perceived flaws in style, plot, and effects, concluding that while the film "suffers from some predictability in its plot, it develops some minor innovations that put it at a cut slightly above mediocre."

Screenwriter David R. Williams wrote "Actually, only the opening scene where the military convoy gets attacked and the concept of the airplane crashing into a mountain side and causing an avalanche to cover the ski resort are mine", explaining that his original screenplay Avalanche Run went through major changes due to producers and directors rewriting the script.

A sequel was planned soon after the film due to the ending of the original. However all plans for a sequel were shelved due to the films 
poor reception.

See also
 Cinema of the United States

References

External links
 Official website (Japan)
 
 

2005 direct-to-video films
American horror films
2005 horror films
Films shot in Vermont
2005 films
Avalanches in film
2000s English-language films
2000s American films
English-language horror films